Jesse LeRoy Thomas (May 23, 1928 – May 16, 2012) was an American football player.  He played college football for Michigan State University. He also competed in track for Michigan State.  After leaving Michigan State, he served two years in the United States Army and then played one year for the Winnipeg Blue Bombers of the Canadian Football League.  He later played in the National Football League for the Baltimore Colts from 1955 to 1957 and in the American Football League for the Los Angeles Chargers in 1960.

References

1928 births
2012 deaths
American football defensive backs
Michigan State Spartans football players
Baltimore Colts players
Los Angeles Chargers players
Winnipeg Blue Bombers players
Players of American football from Oklahoma
People from Logan County, Oklahoma
United States Army soldiers